The Drei-Ähren Railway (German for Three Ears of Corn Railway, French Voie Ferrée Trois Épis) consisted of the  track gauge Electric Tramway from Türkheim to Drei-Ähren and the  track gauge Military Light Railway from Drei-Ähren to Uhlhorst at Drei-Ähren near Colmar in Alsace.

Electric Tramway from Türkheim to Drei-Ähren

History 
The construction of the railway went back to an initiative of the electricity company Schuckert & Co. from Nuremberg, while the Alsace was an Imperial Territory of Germany.

At times there were plans to extend the route from Türkheim to Winzenheim and thereby connect it to Colmar's secondary railway and tram network. The plans were, however, not implemented. After an interruption of operations in the First World War since 1919 under the name Société d’Electricité de Turckheim et Tramways de Turckheim aux Trois Epis (TTE), the railway was shut down on 1 April 1937.

Route 
Drei-Ähren (now Trois Épis) lays good 400 meters higher than Türkheim, which gave the railway the character of a mountain railway - albeit without cogwheel operation.

Operation 
In addition to a freight car and a baggage car, seven tram cars were available for operation.

Military Light Railway from Drei-Ähren to Uhlhorst

History 
Its objective was to transport building materials for the bunkers, barbed wire, weapons, ammunition and supplied to the front line and on the way back bring wounded soldiers to the hospitals. Thousands of French and German soldiers were killed in the battles along this railway line.

On 31 December 1917, the Bavarian FeBA 24 (Feldbahnamt, Light Railway Office) took over the line and operated it until May 1918. After that, FeBA 50 took over the line until the end of the war.

Route 

At the upper terminus of the electric tramway, the goods were reloaded onto the narrow-gauge waggons on the light railway line. These could be hauled upwards on a winch-operated single-track incline car to the military light railway station on the square in front of the pilgrimage church in Drei-Ähren.

At the Bärenstall (literally Bear Cage) station, a branch line turned north to the Lingekopf. The main line continued via Schratzmännle, Barrenkopf and Kleinkopf to the Uhlhorst terminus north of Hohrodberg.

The conveyor track has been decommissioned in the postwar period and lifted by French troops.

Operation 
The military light railway line was operated as a horse-drawn railway or with a benzene locomotive. The journey time was about 1½ hours.

References

External links 
 Le tramway de Turckheim - Trois-Epis.
 Société d'histoire Wickram-Turckheim: Tramway Turckheim-Trois Épis : anecdotes, histoires et images. Société d'histoire et d'archéologie Wickram, Turckheim, Haut-Rhin, 1999.

600 mm gauge railways in France
Railway lines in Grand Est